Isabel Jewell  (July 19, 1907 – April 5, 1972) was an American actress who rose to prominence in the 1930s and early 1940s. Some of her more famous films were Ceiling Zero,  Marked Woman, A Tale of Two Cities, and Gone with the Wind.

Early life
Born in Shoshoni, Wyoming on July 19, 1907, Jewell was the daughter of Emory Lee Jewell and Livia A. Willoughby Jewell. Her father was "a prominent...doctor and medical researcher." She was educated at St. Mary's Academy in Minnesota and at Hamilton College in Kentucky.

Career 

After years in theater stock companies, including an 87-week stint in Lincoln, Nebraska, she got a part on Broadway in Up Pops the Devil (1930). She received glowing critical reviews for Blessed Event (1932) as well.

Jewell's film debut came in Blessed Event (1932). She had been brought to Hollywood by Warner Brothers for the film version of Up Pops the Devil. Jewell gained other supporting roles, appearing in a variety of films in the early 1930s. She played stereotypical gangsters' women in such films as Manhattan Melodrama (1934) and Marked Woman (1937). She was well-received playing against type as the seamstress sentenced to death on the guillotine with Sydney Carton (Ronald Colman in A Tale of Two Cities (1935). Her most significant role was Sally Bates in She Had to Choose. Jewell's films included Gone with the Wind (1939) (in the role of "that white trash, Emmy Slattery"), Northwest Passage (1940), High Sierra (1941), and the low-budget The Leopard Man (1943).

By the end of the 1940s, her roles had reduced in significance to the degree that her performances often were uncredited, e.g. The Snake Pit. She performed in radio dramas in the 1950s, including This Is Your FBI.

In February 1965, she played Madame Ahr, a member of a bank-robbing circus troupe, in an episode of Gunsmoke entitled "Circus Trick."

In 1972, Jewell appeared opposite Edie Sedgwick in the film Ciao! Manhattan. Her final film was the B movie Sweet Kill (1973), the directorial debut of Curtis Hanson.

Personal life 
Jewell's first marriage (which "was not generally known during Jewell's lifetime...[nor] mentioned in the press during her heyday in American films") occurred when she wed Lovell "Cowboy" Underwood when she was 19.

In the mid to late 1930s, Jewell was seen at nightclubs with actor William Hopper. In 1936, she wed Owen Crump, divorcing in 1941 to facilitate her next wedding.

In 1941, Jewell married actor Paul Marion, who was then a private in the Army. They separated in 1943 and were divorced on May 12, 1944.

Jewell was a Democrat who supported Adlai Stevenson's campaign during the 1952 presidential election. She was also a practicing Episcopalian.

Death
Jewell died in Los Angeles, California on April 5, 1972, aged 64, from suicide after taking an overdose of barbiturates. Her ashes were scattered in the Pacific Ocean.

Legacy
In 1960, Jewell was recognized with a star on the Hollywood Walk of Fame for her contribution to motion pictures. The star is located at 1560 Vine Street.

Filmography

References

External links 

1907 births
1972 suicides
American film actresses
American stage actresses
American television actresses
People from Fremont County, Wyoming
Actresses from Wyoming
20th-century American actresses
Barbiturates-related deaths
Drug-related suicides in California
Wyoming Democrats
California Democrats
1972 deaths
American Episcopalians